Duke House, also known as Little River Farm, is a historic home located at Bumpass, Louisa County, Virginia. It was built about 1790, and is a -story, frame dwelling sheathed with beaded weatherboards with an asymmetrical façade and double-shouldered exterior-end brick chimneys. It has a traditional single-pile, central-passage plan. A wing was added to the west end of the house during the first quarter of the 20th century. Also on the property are a contributing frame dependency and family cemetery.

It was listed on the National Register of Historic Places in 2007.

References

Houses on the National Register of Historic Places in Virginia
Georgian architecture in Virginia
Houses completed in 1747
Houses in Louisa County, Virginia
National Register of Historic Places in Louisa County, Virginia